Alberta Provincial Highway No. 30, commonly referred to as Highway 30, was a  long north–south highway in central Alberta, Canada that existed between the 1950s and mid-1980s, connecting the Yellowhead Highway (Highway 16) with the Summer Village of Kapasiwin.

Highway 30 passed through Wabamun Lake Provincial Park and was transferred to Parkland County in the mid-1990s; now referred to as Kapasiwin Road.

References 

030
030